Vasantrao Phulsing Naik (1 July 1913 – 18 August 1979) was a great Indian politician , Social Reformer who served as Chief Minister of Maharashtra from 1963 until 1975. To this date, he remains as the longest-serving Chief Minister of Maharashtra. Also, he had a credit to return to power after completion of full five years. Vasantrao Naik is pioneer of green revolution and white revolution in Maharashtra state. Vasantrao Naik belongs to the Gor dynasty and  Ransot Kshatriya gotra.

Career
He was a Member of the Legislative Assembly of Madhya Pradesh during 1952-1957, of the then bilingual Bombay State during 1957-1960 and of Maharashtra during 1960 to 1977. In 1952, he was appointed Deputy Minister for Revenue in the Government of Madhya Pradesh. He was made Minister for Cooperation in 1957 and, later, Minister for Agriculture in the Government of Bombay State. From 1960 to 1963, he was  Minister for Revenue in the Government of  Maharashtra.

After the death of Marotrao Kannamwar, Naik was elected Chief Minister of Maharashtra, a post which he held for more than eleven years during 1963-1975. He is considered the father of the Green Revolution in Maharashtra. The industrialization of Maharashtra is largely the legacy of his progressive industrial policies.

He was also elected to the 6th Lok Sabha from Washim in 1977.

Death
V. P. Naik died in Singapore on 18 August 1979. Later his nephew Sudhakarrao Naik also became Chief Minister of Maharashtra. Many journalists and experts of political studies attribute the rise of right wing party Shiv Sena in the 1970s to his policy of building up the Shiv Sena as a counterweight to the  communist-led labour unions in Mumbai.

Legacy
He was the founder and Managing Committee member of the Janta Shikshan Prasarak Mandal and the Babasaheb Naik College of Engineering, Pusad. The Shri Vasantrao Naik Government Medical College in Yavatmal city of Maharashtra state, was named in his honour. The 2015 Marathi film Mahanayak vasant tu, starring Chinmay Mandlekar, is his biopic.

References

1913 births
1979 deaths
Chief Ministers of Maharashtra
India MPs 1977–1979
Marathi politicians
Maharashtra MLAs 1960–1962
Maharashtra MLAs 1962–1967
Maharashtra MLAs 1967–1972
Maharashtra MLAs 1972–1978
People from Yavatmal district
Madhya Pradesh MLAs 1952–1957
Lok Sabha members from Maharashtra
People from Washim district
Chief ministers from Indian National Congress
Bombay State MLAs 1957–1960